The Cultural Medallion is a cultural award in Singapore conferred to those who have achieved artistic excellence in dance, theatre, literature, music, photography, art and film. It is widely recognized as Singapore's pinnacle arts award.

History 
The award was instituted in March 1979 by Minister for Culture Ong Teng Cheong and administered by the National Arts Council. The awards was given by the Minister for Culture.

Since 2006, the award was presented by the President of Singapore instead of the Minister for Information, Communications and the Arts (previously known as Minister for Culture). On 20 October Minister for Information, Communications and the Arts Lee Boon Yang announced that project grant for the award is revised to S$80,000 upwards from S$50,000, giving recipients better opportunities to create major works.

From 2013, in an effort to recognise multi-disciplinary artists, it was announced that recipients of the Cultural Medallion and Young Artist Award will no longer be categorised according to art forms.

List of Cultural Medallion recipients

See also
Culture of Singapore

References

Purushothaman, Venka (ed.) (2002) Narratives : Notes On A Cultural Journey : Cultural Medallion Recipients 1979 - 2001. Singapore : National Arts Council.

External links
 CULTURAL MEDALLION
 National Arts Council list of current Nominations and Recipients

Arts in Singapore
Civil awards and decorations of Singapore
Arts awards
Awards established in 1979